The 1903 Tasmanian state election was held on 2 April 1903 in the Australian state of Tasmania to elect 35 members of the Tasmanian House of Assembly. Women got the right to vote at the election.

Elliott Lewis, leader of the Ministerial group, entered the election as the incumbent Premier of Tasmania. At the election, the group lost 10 seats and Lewis lost his seat. The Opposition led by William Propsting won government. The Workers' Political League (the future Australian Labor Party) fielded candidates for the first time, winning three seats. John Earle became leader of the parliamentary party in 1906.

Results

See also
Members of the Tasmanian House of Assembly, 1903–1906

References

1903
1903 elections in Australia
1900s in Tasmania